The 1975 Australian federal election was held in Australia on 13 December 1975. All 127 seats in the House of Representatives and all 64 seats in the Senate were up for election, due to a double dissolution.

Malcolm Fraser had been commissioned as caretaker prime minister following the dismissal of Gough Whitlam's three-year-old Labor government by Governor-General Sir John Kerr, on 11 November 1975. The same day, Fraser advised an immediate double dissolution, in accordance with Kerr's stipulated conditions (see 1975 Australian constitutional crisis).

The Coalition of Fraser's Liberal Party of Australia and Doug Anthony's National Country Party secured government in its own right, winning the largest majority government to date in Australian history. The Liberals actually won a majority in their own right, with 68 seats–the first time that the main non-Labor party had done so since adopting the Liberal banner in 1944. Although Fraser had no need for the support of the National Country Party, the Coalition was retained. This election was the last time the Coalition won more than 50% of the primary vote.

Labor suffered a 30-seat swing and saw its lower house caucus cut almost in half, to 36 seats—fewer than it had when Whitlam became leader in the aftermath of the Coalition landslide nearly 10 years earlier, in the 1966 election. With only 28% of the House of Representatives seats, this is the worst seat share for Labor since the current Liberal-Labor party contest from 1946.



Results

House of Representatives results

Senate results

Notes
 Independent: Brian Harradine (Tasmania)

Seats changing hands

 Members listed in italics did not contest their seat at this election.

Issues and significance

The election followed the controversial dismissal of the Whitlam government by Governor-General Sir John Kerr in the 1975 constitutional crisis. Labor campaigners hoped that the electorate would "maintain [its] rage" and punish the Coalition for its part in bringing down the government, proclaiming "Shame Fraser, Shame". However, the Coalition focused on economic issues following the 1973 oil crisis and 1973–75 recession, the so-called Loans Affair, alleged Labor mismanagement of inflation, and campaigned under the slogan "Turn on the lights, Australia" (drawing on a contemporary cynicism: "Would the last businessman leaving Australia please turn out the lights?").

The Australian Capital Territory and the Northern Territory received an entitlement to elect two senators each as a consequence of the Senate (Representation of Territories) Act 1973, passed during the 1974 Joint Sitting of the Australian Parliament.

See also
 Candidates of the Australian federal election, 1975
 Members of the Australian House of Representatives, 1975–1977
 Members of the Australian Senate, 1975–1978

References
AustralianPolitics.com 1975 election details
University of WA  election results in Australia since 1890
AEC 2PP vote

1975 Australian constitutional crisis
1975 elections in Australia
Federal elections in Australia
Gough Whitlam
Malcolm Fraser
December 1975 events in Australia
Landslide victories